Danko Šipka (born 1962) is a Serbian American linguist and professor of Slavic languages and applied linguistics at Arizona State University.

Biography

He was born in Banja Luka in 1962. He graduated Slavistics at the Faculty of Philosophy in Sarajevo in 1985 and later obtained PhD in linguistics at the Faculty of Philology in Belgrade. He was educated at Polish Academy of Sciences, Adam Mickiewicz University, and University of Belgrade in the fields of linguistics and psychology. He was an Alexander von Humboldt Foundation, Fulbright program, and American Council of Learned Societies fellow. He received fellowships from the Australian National University, and Hokkaido University, Japan. In 2010, he received titular professorship from the president of the Republic of Poland Bronisław Komorowski. He won NCOLCTL Walton Award in 2019. In the spring of 2021 he was an Istvan Deak Visiting Professor at Columbia University

Research

Šipka is the author of various monographs and dictionaries, such as Serbian-English general dictionaries for "Prometej", the monograph titled Lexical Conflict: Theory and practice with Cambridge University Press; and Lexical Layers of Identity: Words, Meaning, and Culture in the Slavic Languages.
His main research interests lie in the fields of lexicography, lexicology, linguistic anthropology, computational linguistics, and Slavic linguistics. In 2017, Sipka has signed the Declaration on the Common Language of the Croats, Serbs, Bosniaks and Montenegrins. Sipka was the editor-in-chief of the Journal of the National Council of Less Commonly Taught Languages from 2008 to 2020.

References

Lexicographers
Slavists
Arizona State University faculty
1962 births
Living people
Signatories of the Declaration on the Common Language